XHONG-FM is a radio station on 100.9 FM in Ojinaga, Chihuahua, Mexico. The station is owned by Grupo BM Radio and carries a grupera format known as La Primera.

History
XHONG received its concession on December 5, 1997. It was originally owned by Francisco Javier Velasco Siles, but in 2010 the concession was transferred to a Radiorama subsidiary. Radiorama then sold XHONG to BM.

References

Radio stations in Chihuahua